An election to Monaghan County Council took place on 5 June 2009 as part of that year's Irish local elections. 20 councillors were elected from four electoral divisions by PR-STV voting for a five-year term of office.

Results by party

Results by Electoral Area

Carrickmacross

Castleblayney

Clones

Monaghan

External links
 Official website

2009 Irish local elections
Monaghan County Council elections